David K. Gassner (born December 14, 1978) is a former professional baseball pitcher. Gassner is a 1997 graduate of Hortonville High School in Hortonville, Wisconsin and 2002 graduate of Purdue University with a degree in Education.

Career
Gassner played college baseball for the Purdue Boilermakers from 1998–2001.

He was selected by Toronto Blue Jays in the 2001 amateur entry draft, and played in their minor league organization from  through 

On December 15, 2003, Gassner was sent to the Minnesota Twins to complete a trade made on July 16, 2003 where the Blue Jays sent Shannon Stewart and a player to be named later (Gassner) to the Twins for Bobby Kielty.

Gassner spent the entire  season with the Rochester Red Wings of the International League.  On April 16, 2005 made his major league debut  for the Twins against the Cleveland Indians getting the win by pitching 6 innings giving up only one earned run.  Gassner was to have only one more start for the Twins, spending most of the season with the Rochester Red Wings.

Gassner missed the majority of the  season with a left elbow strain and spent the entire  season with the Rochester Red Wings where he compiled a 6-12 record and a 4.95 ERA.

Gassner started the  season playing for the York Revolution of the Atlantic League, but on June 6, 2008 he was signed to a minor league contract by the Boston Red Sox and assigned to the Double-A Portland Sea Dogs.

On June 7 Gassner made his first start for the Sea Dogs against the Akron Aeros earning a no decision after pitching 5 innings, allowing 6 hits and 2 earned runs. He became a free agent at the end of the season. Gassner signed with the York Revolution of the Atlantic League for the 2009 season. He retired on August 26, 2009.

Awards and recognition
 2001 – Big Ten Conference All-Star SP
 2003 – Eastern League (AA) All-Star and League ERA Leader.
 2004 – Triple-A All-Star SP
 2007 – International League Pitcher of the Week

After baseball life
In 2010, Gassner was named head coach of the Appleton West varsity baseball team in Appleton, Wisconsin. He is also a substitute teacher in the fields of science and mathematics for the Appleton Area School District.

References

External links

1978 births
Living people
Minnesota Twins players
Baseball players from Wisconsin
Major League Baseball pitchers
New Haven Ravens players
Rochester Red Wings players
Portland Sea Dogs players
Purdue Boilermakers baseball players
York Revolution players
People from Hortonville, Wisconsin
Alaska Goldpanners of Fairbanks players
Charleston AlleyCats players
Dunedin Blue Jays players
Fort Myers Miracle players
Gulf Coast Twins players
Syracuse SkyChiefs players
Tennessee Smokies players